Epacris longiflora, commonly known as fuchsia heath or cigarette flower, is a plant in the family Ericaceae and is endemic to eastern Australia. It is an erect or spreading shrub with egg-shaped, pointed leaves and red tube-shaped flowers which give the plant its name longiflora and are usually present throughout the year. Its native range extends from the central coast of New South Wales to southern Queensland.

Description
The leaves are thin, flat and have margins with minute teeth. There are five petals which are fused to form a tube with five lobes at the end. Within the petal tube there is a central style with the stigma at its tip and an ovary at its base. The stamens are hidden inside the tube. Flowering occurs throughout the year, although there are fewer flowers in summer.

Taxonomy and naming
Epacris longiflora was first formally described by Antonio José Cavanilles in 1797 and the description was published in his book Icones et descriptiones plantarum. The specific epithet (longiflora) means "long-flowered". The vernacular name "cigarette flower" is from the pattern on the flower.

Distribution and habitat
Fuchsia heath is found on the coast and tablelands from south-eastern Queensland to Berry in New South Wales. It grows in sandy soil on cliff faces, in heath to woodland margins and in dry sclerophyll forest.

Ecology
Plants are thought to live 5–20 years in the wild.

Use in horticulture
A highly regarded ornamental garden plant, E. longiflora was first cultivated in England in 1803. It grows in a variety of soils as long as the drainage is good, and does best in a partly shaded position.

Along with other members of the genus, Epacris longiflora initially proved difficult to grow and maintain on original soil in the Australian National Botanic Gardens in Canberra.

References

External links

longiflora
Ericales of Australia
Flora of New South Wales
Flora of Queensland
Plants described in 1797
Taxa named by Antonio José Cavanilles